Epermenia stolidota is a moth in the family Epermeniidae. It was described by Edward Meyrick in 1917. It is found in North America, where it has been recorded from Wyoming, Colorado, Utah and Arizona.

The wingspan is 20-22 mm. The forewings are whitish ocherous, between the veins more ocherous and irrorated (speckled) with light gray and a few blackish scales. The stigmata are small and black and the plical elongate, very obliquely beyond the first discal. The hindwings are light gray.

References

Epermeniidae
Moths described in 1917
Taxa named by Edward Meyrick
Moths of North America